Latin honors are a system of Latin phrases used in some colleges and universities to indicate the level of distinction with which an academic degree has been earned.  The system is primarily used in the United States. It is also used in some Southeastern Asian countries with European colonial history, such as Indonesia and the Philippines, although sometimes translations of these phrases are used instead of the Latin originals. The honors distinction should not be confused with the honors degrees offered in some countries, or with honorary degrees.

The system usually has three levels of honor: cum laude, magna cum laude, and summa cum laude. Generally, a college or university's regulations set out definite criteria a student must meet to obtain a given honor. For example, the student might be required to achieve a specific grade point average, submit an honors thesis for evaluation, be part of an honors program, or graduate early. Each school sets its own standards. Since these standards vary, the same level of Latin honors conferred by different institutions can represent different levels of achievement. Similarly, some institutions grant equivalent (or additional) non-Latin honors to undergraduates. The University of Wisconsin–Madison, for example, has a series of plain English grading honors based on class standing. Some colleges and universities, such as Reed College and Yale Law School, do not use honors at all.

These honors, when they are used, are almost always awarded to undergraduates earning their bachelor's, and, with the exception of law school graduates, much more rarely to graduate students receiving their master's or doctorate degree. The honor is typically indicated on the diploma. Latin honors are often conferred upon law school students graduating as a Juris Doctor or J.D., in which case they are generally based upon class rank or grade point average.

English-speaking countries

United States

Distinctions
In the United States, most colleges and universities use Latin honors for bachelor's degrees and the Juris Doctor law degree. They are not normally used for any other degrees, such as master's degrees or the PhD and MD degrees.

There are three standard levels of Latin honors, listed below in ascending order:
cum laude, meaning "with praise", typically awarded to graduates in the top 20%, 25%, or 30% of their class, depending on the institution.
magna cum laude, meaning "with great praise", typically awarded to graduates in the top 5%, 10%, or 15% of their class, depending on the institution.
, meaning "with highest praise", typically awarded to graduates in the top 1%, 2%, or 5% of their class, depending on the institution. Some institutions do not award the summa cum laude distinction or only award it in extraordinary circumstances.

History
In 1869, Harvard College became the first college in the United States to award final honors to its graduates. From 1872 to 1879, cum laude and summa cum laude were the two Latin honors awarded to graduates. Beginning in 1880, magna cum laude was also awarded:

In his 1895 history of Amherst College, college historian William Seymour Tyler traced Amherst's system of Latin honors to 1881, and attributed it to Amherst College president Julius Hawley Seelye:

United Kingdom 

 In the UK the Latin cum laude is used in commemorative Latin versions of degree certificates sold by a few universities (e.g. the University of Edinburgh) to denote a bachelor's degree with honors, but the honors classification is stated as in English, e.g. primi ordinis for first class rather than summa cum laude, etc.  Official degree certificates use English.

Other countries
For undergraduate degrees, Latin honors are used in only a few countries such as Israel, Indonesia, the Dominican Republic, the Philippines and Canada. Most countries use a different scheme, such as the British undergraduate degree classification (usually used in Commonwealth countries) which is more widely used with varying criteria and nomenclature depending on country, including Australia, Bangladesh, Barbados, Brazil, Colombia, Georgia, Hong Kong, India, Ireland, Jamaica, Kenya, New Zealand, Nigeria, Pakistan, Singapore, Sri Lanka, South Africa, Trinidad and Tobago, Uganda, the United Kingdom, Zimbabwe and many other countries. Malta shows the Latin honors on the degree certificates, but the UK model is shown on the transcript.

Austria 
Candidates must have consistently excellent grades throughout high school and university, making it very difficult to attain: only about 20 out of a total of 2,500 doctoral graduates per year (i.e. 0.8%) achieve a  degree.

Belgium 
In Belgium, the university degree awarded is limited to:

  <68% ( in French,  in Dutch) 
  >68% ( in French,  in Dutch)
  >77% ( in French,  in Dutch)
  >85% ( in French,  in Dutch)
  with the congratulations of the examination committee >90% ( in French,  in Dutch)

Brazil 
In Brazil, most universities do not provide honors to their students. Among the few universities that do so, the Instituto Tecnológico de Aeronáutica (ITA—Technological Institute of Aeronautics) awards the  honor for graduates with every individual grade above 8.5 (out of 10.0), the  honor for graduates with average grade above 8.5 and more than 50% of individual grades above 9.5, and the  honor for graduates with average grade above 9.5. As of 2009, only 22 graduates have received the  honor at ITA. The Federal University of Rio de Janeiro awards the  honor for graduates with average grade from 8.0 to 8.9, the  honor for graduates with average grade from 9.0 to 9.4, and the  honor for graduates with average grade from 9.5 to 10.0. The Federal University of Ceará awards the  honor for undergraduates who have never failed a course, achieved an average grade from 8.5 (out of 10.0) and have received a fellowship of both Academic Extension and Teaching Initiation.

Estonia 
Since 1 September 2010, only  is used. It is awarded to bachelors, masters and integrated studies graduates. Occasionally the word , which means "with praise", is substituted for the usual . To receive  one must achieve a 4.60 GPA (out of 5) and receive the highest grade (A – 5.00) for the thesis or the final examination.

Finland 

They are roughly equivalent to Finnish school grades ranging from 4 to 10.

France 
However some Grandes Écoles, like the Institut d'études politiques de Paris, HEC Paris, use the Latin and English titles  / "graduated with highest honors" for the top 2% and  / "graduated with honors" for the next 5% of a year. From 2016, honorifics ceased to be used for the completion of a PhD.

Germany 
In Germany, the range of degrees is:

  ("below any scale", fail, numerical grade 5.0) (see Sub omni canone in German Wikipedia)
  ("duly" conferred, that is, the requirements are fulfilled, numerical grade 3.0–4.0),
  – or no additional comment ("satisfying", numerical grade 3.0),
  ("with honors", numerical grade 2.0),
  ("with great honors", numerical grade 1.0),
  ("with highest honors", numerical grade < 1.0).

These degrees are mostly used when a doctorate is conferred, not for diplomas, bachelor's or master's degrees, for which numerical grades between 1.0 ("very good") and 4.0 ("pass"), and 5.0 ("fail"), are given.

Hungary 
In Hungary, the range of degrees—similar to the German system—is:  ("duly" conferred, that is, the requirements are fulfilled),  (with honors),  (with highest honors). These degrees are used in university diplomas and in certain fields of sciences (medical, legal and a very few others) only. The grades of degrees are dependent on the received average points from final exams and from average points from the university studies.

Italy 
In Italy, the  notation ( being the equivalent in Italian) is used as an increasing level of the highest grade for both exams (30/30) and degrees (110/110), in all its levels; 
Passing an exam  has usually only an honorific meaning, but sometimes it influences the average grade and can be useful to the student so honored (usually weighting 31/30).  is usually awarded after answering correctly a bonus difficult question at the oral examination.

In Italy  (at institutions using a 110-point system) is the highest rank that can be achieved during the academic studies, and corresponds usually to a final score greater than 110/110 (the specific threshold varies from university to university). Up to 3 bonus points can be awarded for merits, e.g. having an average exams score greater than 28.5/30 (95% equivalent), excellent final project or for graduating on time.

Malta 
In Malta, for Bachelor Honours degrees  refers to first class honours,  refers to second class honours (upper division),  refers to second class honours (lower division), whilst  refers to third class honours. Professional degrees lasting longer than the standard 3 years such as the 5 year Bachelor of Pharmacy are awarded . Postgraduate diplomas and master's degrees may be awarded as pass with distinction, pass with merit, or pass.

Mexico 

Netherlands 
Typically these distinctions are reserved to mark exceptional achievement above a high minimum grade point average. Sometimes it is lost, despite a high average mark, when the student gets a mark of 6 or lower for one of the many exams (on a scale of 1–10, where 10 is the highest). It may also be awarded based on the weighted average of first achieved grades for each subject only. Generally, less than 2% receive the  distinction. It is also possible to receive a PhD degree , although this honor is even rarer than for master's graduates. In view of the difficulty and subjectivity of determining this, some universities and fields of study very seldom award doctorates . At Dutch university colleges ,  and, exceptionally,  may be awarded.

Philippines 
In the Philippines, junior high school and senior high school students under the new K–12 curriculum use an honor system using Filipino translations of the Latin original. Students who achieve a final grade average of 90-94 are awarded the title  and will receive a bronze medal with the DepEd seal.

Russia 
In Russia, the honor system is based on the grade point average. At least 4.75 out of 5.0 points are required for the summa cum laude degree (in Russian, "with excellence"). The graduate has to receive a perfect grade on all final examinations. Usually less than 2% of all graduating students accomplish this (depending on the university and year). In military schools, a "red diploma" may be accompanied by a gold medal for outstanding performance. Russian high schools also award a gold medal to the student who achieves a perfect score in all final examinations and in all other subjects not requiring a final exam. A silver medal is awarded to high school students who have one or two grades of 4 ("good", being second highest grade) on their final exams or other subjects as listed in the high school diploma.

Singapore 
Graduates from Singapore Management University have to achieve GPAs of 3.4, 3.6 and 3.8 out of 4.3 (SMU awards 4.3 for A+ grades) respectively and without any exceptions to qualify for the Latin honors.

It is also used by Yale-NUS College, with the top 5% of a graduating class receiving , the next 10% , and the next 20% . There are no CAP requirements to achieve the Latin honors at Yale-NUS College.

South Africa 
In South Africa, the Latin honors  is used for bachelor's degrees and master's degrees, and is awarded to students who has achieved an average grade of 70% or higher throughout the degree.  in South Africa can be considered broadly equivalent to a first class degree in the United Kingdom or a GPA of 3.7–4.0 in the United States.

Spain 
In Spain, the Latin honors  is used for PhD degrees only, and is awarded after a secret vote of the jury members, using envelopes that must be opened in a separate session, and requiring unanimity.

Switzerland 

Ukraine 
In Ukraine, the university education honor system is based on by-law # 161 (2 June 1993) of the Ministry of Education of Ukraine (3.12.3.5). For a student to graduate from a university with a diploma with honors, students have to receive mark 5 (excellent) at least on 75% of courses, receive mark 4 (good) at max 25% of courses, and pass the state exams only with mark 5 (excellent). Also, students are expected to have participated in research projects with visible results.

See also

References

External links
Brandenburg University of Technology Cottbus, concerning Latin honors §15, in German

Academic honours
Qualifications
Latin words and phrases